Vítězslav Veselý (born 27 February 1983) is a Czech javelin thrower. He won two bronze medals at the Olympic games, in 2012 and 2020.

Career
He finished ninth at the 2002 World Junior Championships. He threw a personal best throw of 81.20 metres during the qualifying round at the 2008 Olympic Games and finished twelfth in the final. He was less successful at his first World Championships in Athletics the following year, failing to make the final with a throw of 75.76 m.

Veselý improved his personal best by more than five metres at a meeting in Olomouc in May 2010, throwing a world leading mark of 86.45 m. He was ninth at the 2010 European Athletics Championships that year. He came close to a major medal with a fourth-place finish at the 2011 World Championships in Athletics. He had his second best ever throw at the Shanghai 2012 Diamond League meet, winning with a mark of 85.40 m. At the 2012 Olympic Games, Veselý threw a new personal best of 88.34 m to improve his world lead; in the final, however, his last throw of 83.34 m was only good enough for 4th place. In 2017, following the disqualification of Oleksandr Pyatnytsya due to doping, Veselý was awarded the bronze medal.

In 2013 Veselý won the World Championships with a mark of 87.17 meters, only 10 cm ahead of Tero Pitkämäki. With this result he became the second Czech world champion in men's javelin throw beside Jan Železný.

During 2014 he wasn't able to defend his title at the Europeans: Veselý finished second with 84.79 m behind Antti Ruuskanen, who was in his best form in the final, reaching 88.01 m at the third round.

Achievements

Seasonal bests by year
2002 – 73.22
2006 – 75.98
2007 – 79.45
2008 – 81.20
2009 – 80.35
2010 – 86.45
2011 – 84.11
2012 – 88.34
2013 – 87.58
2014 – 87.38
2015 – 88.18
2016 – 84.82
2017 – 82.29
2018 – 82.30
2019 – 82.85
2020 – 83.03
2021 – 85.44

References

External links

1983 births
Living people
People from Hodonín
Czech male javelin throwers
Athletes (track and field) at the 2008 Summer Olympics
Athletes (track and field) at the 2012 Summer Olympics
Athletes (track and field) at the 2016 Summer Olympics
Olympic athletes of the Czech Republic
European Athletics Championships medalists
World Athletics Championships athletes for the Czech Republic
World Athletics Championships medalists
Diamond League winners
World Athletics Championships winners
Athletes (track and field) at the 2020 Summer Olympics
Medalists at the 2012 Summer Olympics
Medalists at the 2020 Summer Olympics
Olympic bronze medalists in athletics (track and field)
Olympic bronze medalists for the Czech Republic
Sportspeople from the South Moravian Region